Young People's Chorus of New York City is an internationally acclaimed children's chorus based in New York City.  The Young People's Chorus (YPC) provides children of all ethnic, religious and economic backgrounds  with a unique program of music education and choral performance, while maintaining a model of artistic excellence and humanity that enriches the community.  The Young People's Chorus was founded by MacArthur Fellow Francisco Nunez in 1988 "to provide children of all ethnic, religious, and economic backgrounds with a safe haven for personal and artistic growth."

The Young People's Chorus has performed in many venues around the world, including in Brazil, Argentina, Sweden, Japan, China, the Dominican Republic, Wales, Germany, Bulgaria, Spain, the Czech Republic, Austria, Canada and France.  In the United States, the Young People's Chorus has performed on Good Morning America, and at Lincoln Center, Carnegie Hall, the United Nations and the White House.

Among YPC's many other awards and honors are Chorus America's Education Outreach Award and two Chorus America/ASCAP Awards for Adventurous Programming. YPC was one of the first inductees in the WNET/Thirteen Community Hall of Fame and has been recognized for its work with urban at-risk youth by the New York State Assembly, the Mayor of the City of New York, the Manhattan Borough, and by the President's Committee on the Arts and Humanities as “a national model of artistic excellence and diversity” under the administrations of Presidents Bill Clinton, George W. Bush, and Barack Obama.  In 2011, the Young People's Chorus received the 2011 National Arts and Humanities Youth Program Award from the first lady, Michelle Obama, at a White House ceremony.

References

Choirs in New York City
Musical groups from New York City
Youth choirs
1988 establishments in New York City
Musical groups established in 1988